Deymkaran Rural District is a rural district (dehestan) in Salehabad District, Bahar County, Hamadan Province, Iran. At the 2006 census, its population was 9,409, in 2,071 families. The rural district has 16 villages.

References 

Rural Districts of Hamadan Province
Bahar County